UDJ may refer to:

Unity for Democracy and Justice, an Ethiopian political party
Uzhhorod International Airport
University of Detroit Jesuit High School and Academy, a private high school in Detroit, Michigan, USA